"Strange Times"  is the first official single by Mohsen Namjoo.This is the first song performed in English by Mohsen Namjoo. "Strange Times" words came from the Iranian poet Ahmad Shamlou.

It was officially released in June 2010.

Track listing
 "Strange Times" (5:53)

References

Mohsen Namjoo songs
2010 singles
2010 songs